Match! Arena, formerly Sport-1 until January 25, 2016, is a Russian pay sport television channel that broadcasts in SD & HDTV 16:9 format.

It was launched on August 10, 2010 by the All-Russia State Television and Radio Broadcasting Company under the name Sport-1. In October 2015, Sport-1 was acquired by Gazprom-Media and subsequently re-branded as Match! Arena.

Broadcast 
 Football:
 FIFA: 2014 FIFA World Cup (qualifiers matches), FIFA Confederations Cup.
 European national tournaments: Ligue 1, FA Cup, DFB-Pokal.
 UEFA: UEFA Europa League (qualification rounds, matches with the participation of Russian clubs).
 Conmebol: Copa Libertadores, Copa Sudamericana.
 Hockey: KHL (The Finals), IIHF World Championships
 Autosport: Formula 1 (including all practices), Porsche Supercup, Formula Renault, DTM, IndyCar
 Biathlon: World Cup, World Championships
 Boxing: professional boxing
 Olympics: 2014 Winter Olympics

External links 
 Sport-1 website 

Russian-language television stations in Russia
Television channels and stations established in 2010
2010 establishments in Russia
Sports television networks in Russia